Cumalıkızık is a village in the Yıldırım district of Bursa Province, located 10 kilometers east of the city of Bursa, at the foot of Mount Uludağ. Its history goes back to the Ottoman Empire's foundation period. The village is now included within the border of the Yıldırım district as a neighbourhood. Cumalıkızık was founded as a vakıf village. The historical texture of the village has been well protected and the civilian countryside architectural structures of the early Ottoman period are still intact. Because of this, Cumalıkızık has become a popular but still unspoiled center for tourists.

A group of similar villages which are placed close together between the foot of mount Uludağ and the valleys have been called Kızık in Turkish. The name stands for one of the twenty-four clans of the Oghuz Turks and the people from the villages also called Kızık.  Similar villages, less well preserved, are Değirmenlikızık, Derekızık, and Hamamlıkızık (see Kızık for other places named Kızık in Turkey). Hamamlıkızık was the village of the local baths (hamam), and  Cumalıkızık was named because people gathered there on Friday (Cuma, in Turkish) for worship.

The Cumalıkızık ethnography museum in the village's square displays historical objects from the village. Every June there is a raspberry festival. The famous Cumalıkızık houses are made out of wood, adobe, rubblestones. Most of them are triplex houses. The windows upstairs are generally latticed and with a bay window. The handles and knockers on the main entry doors are made of wrought iron. Cobblestone streets are very narrow with no sidewalks, but a typical medieval gutter in the center for rain and waste water.

A mosque, the fountain of 'Zekiye Hatun' next to the mosque and a bath with one dome are original from the Ottoman Empire. There is also a ruin of a church built by Byzantines.

Cumalıkızık holds 270 historical houses. Some of these houses are in process of restoration and maintenance, and 180 of them are still being used as dwellings.

In 1969, the remains of a Byzantine church were unearthed southeast of the village in the foothills of Mt. Uludağ. Some architectural works are on display in the Archeological Museum of Bursa. Movies and television programs with historical settings have often been recorded in Cumalıkızık.

See also 
 Kızık (disambiguation)
 List of World Heritage Sites in Turkey

References

Villages in Yıldırım District